Anthonology is a collection by Piers Anthony published in 1985.

Plot summary
Anthonology is a collection of 21 short science-fiction and fantasy stories.

Reception
Dave Langford reviewed Anthonology for White Dwarf #86, and stated that "Some display the compulsive daftness of Anthony at his best [...] many could usefully have remained in obscurity; one is an incredibly filthy joke which would shock your editor if described here. Acerbic introductions bewail the bad taste of editors and the obtuseness of critics."

Reviews
Review by W. D. Stevens (1986) in Fantasy Review, May 1986
Review by Robert Coulson (1987) in Amazing Stories, May 1987
Review by Ken Brown (1987) in Interzone, #20 Summer 1987

References

1985 novels